Blood Brothers is a 1975 East German western film directed by Werner W. Wallroth and starring Dean Reed, Gojko Mitic, and Gisela Freudenberg.

The film's sets were designed by the art directors Heinz Röske and Marlene Willmann. It was made by the state-controlled DEFA company.

Cast

References

Bibliography

External links 
 

1975 films
East German films
German Western (genre) films
German historical films
1975 Western (genre) films
1970s historical films
1970s German-language films
Films directed by Werner W. Wallroth
Films set in the 1860s
Ostern films
1970s German films